Tribasodites bama is a species of beetle first found in Guangxi, China.

References

Staphylinidae
Insects of China